Ascoclavulina is a genus of fungi in the family Helotiaceae. This is a monotypic genus, containing the single species Ascoclavulina sakaii.

References

External links
Ascoclavulina at Index Fungorum

Helotiaceae
Monotypic Ascomycota genera